Sunday Ndukwo Onuoha is the founder and president of Vision Africa International and the co-chair, Interfaith Dialogue Forum for Peace. In 2003, he was consecrated as Bishop in the Methodist Church Nigeria and appointed as Special Assistant on Privatization in Nigerian President Olusegun Obasanjo's Presidential Cabinet.

Sunday Onuoha is the gubernatorial candidate of African Democratic Congress (ADC) in Abia State.

Early life

Sunday Ndukwo Onuoha was born in Item, Abia State, Nigeria, on March 22, 1964. Sunday is a common English name among first-generation Christian households in Nigeria.

He joined the ministry at a very young age in 1983, and was consecrated a Bishop of the Methodist Church Nigeria in 2006, having served as the first Bishop of Evangelism at the Lagos Headquarters for many years.

Education

Due to financial difficulty, Sunday couldn't complete his high school. Instead, he relocated to Aba, where he worked as a tailor and began studies for the Nigerian equivalent of a high school exam for college admission.

In 1983, Bishop Sunday was offered admission into the Methodist Church Nigeria ministry. He went to the Methodist Theological Institute in Sagamu, the Immanuel College of Theology in Ibadan, and the University of Ibadan to get his B.A.

Sunday traveled to the United States in 1995 to pursue his Masters and Doctorate at Southern Methodist University's Perkins School of Theology in Dallas, Texas. The title of Sunday's doctoral thesis was Vision Africa.

Career

He was a pastor in numerous congregations, a seminary professor, and a mission and outreach worker in Nigeria. He also served as the first Chairman of the Youths for the Nigerian state of Abia.

He was named Special Assistant on Privatization to Nigerian President Olusegun Obasanjo's Presidential Cabinet in 2003.

Ministry

Sunday was a member of an evangelical group attending a camp gathering on May 25, 1978, where the story of God in the person of Jesus Christ was told again. Sunday witnessed a God who cried on the cross in Jesus on that day. God did not abandon Jesus in the midst of his screams for help. Sunday resolved at the age of 14 to spend the rest of his life sharing that same love with others.

In 2006, he was consecrated as Bishop of Methodist Church Nigeria. He was the first Bishop in-charge of Evangelism in the Methodist Church Nigeria, serving for six years. Bishop Sunday was named the World Methodist Evangelism's Regional Secretary for West Africa in 2012.

Sunday was named president of the Nigerian Inter-Faith Action Association (NIFAA) in 2009, the world's largest Christian-Muslim collaboration.

Family

Sunday, who has since become a naturalized American citizen, has dual citizenship and dual residency in Nigeria and the United States. Sunday married Ugonna Osoka of Item in 1992, and she earned a Masters of Christian Education from SMU's Perkins School of Theology and works as a chaplain at Children's Medical Center in Dallas.  Agnes, Jane, and Isaac are Ugonna and Sunday's three children.

References

1964 births
Living people
Methodist bishops
African Democratic Congress politicians
Abia State politicians
Igbo politicians
Alumni of Immanuel College of Theology, Ibadan
Perkins School of Theology alumni
Southern Methodist University alumni
Nigerian religious leaders
21st-century bishops